Alexander Ramsey (1867–1942) was an English footballer who played in The Football League for West Bromwich Albion.

References

1867 births
1942 deaths
Place of death missing
English footballers
West Bromwich Albion F.C. players
English Football League players
Kidderminster Harriers F.C. players
Association football defenders